The 2si 540 and 2si 500 are a family of in-line twin-cylinder, liquid-cooled, two-stroke, dual ignition, aircraft engines that were designed for ultralight aircraft.

The basic engine was originally designed and produced by JLO-Motorenwerke of Germany and was later acquired by the AMW Cuyuna Engine Company of Beaufort, South Carolina and marketed under the Cuyuna brand name. Later the engine was marketed by Cuyuna under the Two Stroke International (2si) brand. Cuyuna no longer markets engines for aircraft use although the 540 is still in production as a sport vehicle engine.

Development
The 540 is a conventional twin-cylinder engine that weighs  in its L70 aircraft version. The engine features dual capacitor discharge ignition (single in the sport vehicle version), reed valve porting, tuned exhaust system, two slide venturi-type carburetors, liquid cooling, fuel pump, a cast iron cylinder liner, ball, needle and roller bearings throughout. The aircraft version was offered with an optional gearbox reduction system. Starting is electric starter or recoil starter.

This was done to reduce the displacement to under 500 cc and allow the engine to be used for Formula 500 auto racing.

Variants
500L-85
Gasoline sport vehicle engine for Formula 500 auto racing. Dual carburetors,  at 8000 rpm, still in production.
540-L70
Gasoline aircraft engine, dual carburetors,  at 7000 rpm, weight , out of production.
540L-90
Gasoline sport vehicle engine for auto racing, kart and all-terrain vehicle applications. Dual carburetors,  at 8000 rpm, still in production.

Applications
Aircraft
RagWing RW8 PT2S
Automotive
Formula 500

Specifications (540-L70 aircraft engine)

See also

References

Two-stroke aircraft piston engines